This is a list of events in South African sport in 1992.

Football (rugby union)
 15 August - South Africa plays their first test since the end of the apartheid.

Football (soccer)

July
 7 July - South Africa beats Cameroon 1-0 at King's Park Rugby Stadium, Durban in a friendly match
 9 July - South Africa loses against Cameroon 1-2 at Goodwood Show Grounds, Cape Town in a friendly match
 9 July - South Africa draws against Cameroon national football team 2-2 at Soccer City, Johannesburg in a friendly match

August
 16 August - South Africa loses to Zimbabwe 1-4 at the National Sports Stadium, Harare, Zimbabwe in the African Nations Cup qualifiers
 30 August - South Africa loses to Zambia 0-1 at Soccer City, Johannesburg in the African Nations Cup qualifiers

October
 10 October - South Africa loses to Nigeria 0-4 at Surulere Stadium, Lagos, Nigeria in the World Cup qualifiers
 24 October - South Africa beats Congo 1-0 at Soccer City, Johannesburg in the World Cup qualifiers

Motorsport
 1 March - The South African Grand Prix, is held at Kyalami

See also
1992 in South Africa
1993 in South African sport
List of years in South African sport

 
South Africa